Ewan Clague (1896–1987) was the commissioner of the U.S. Bureau of Labor Statistics (BLS) from 1946 to 1965.

In 1952 he was elected as a Fellow of the American Statistical Association.

Education
Clague graduated from the University of Washington and earned a doctorate from the University of Wisconsin.

References 

1896 births
1987 deaths
American civil servants
Bureau of Labor Statistics
Fellows of the American Statistical Association
University of Washington alumni
University of Wisconsin–Madison alumni
Truman administration personnel
Eisenhower administration personnel
Kennedy administration personnel
Lyndon B. Johnson administration personnel